Dieumerci Ndongala (born 14 June 1991) is a Congolese professional footballer who plays as a winger for Cypriot First Division club APOEL and the DR Congo national team.

Club career 
In 2014, Ndongala joined Belgian Pro League side Charleroi from La Louvière. He made his Belgian Pro League debut at 8 February 2014 in a 3–1 away defeat against Lokeren. He scored his first Belgian Pro League goal at 3 May 2014 in a 2–1 away defeat against K.V. Kortrijk.

On 31 January 2017, Ndongala returned to Standard Liège.

Honours

Club
Genk
Belgian First Division: 2018–19

References

Dieumerci Ndongala tekent voor 4 seizoenen‚ kaagentnieuws.be, 21 June 2016

External links
 
 

1991 births
Living people
Association football wingers
Democratic Republic of the Congo footballers
Democratic Republic of the Congo international footballers
Democratic Republic of the Congo expatriate footballers
Belgian footballers
Belgian people of Democratic Republic of the Congo descent
Belgian Pro League players
Süper Lig players
Jeunesse Esch players
UR La Louvière Centre players
R. Charleroi S.C. players
K.A.A. Gent players
Standard Liège players
K.R.C. Genk players
Kasımpaşa S.K. footballers
Expatriate footballers in Luxembourg